Zakrzewek may refer to the following places:
Zakrzewek, Włocławek County in Kuyavian-Pomeranian Voivodeship (north-central Poland)
Zakrzewek, Sępólno County in Kuyavian-Pomeranian Voivodeship (north-central Poland)
Zakrzewek, Masovian Voivodeship (east-central Poland)
Zakrzewek, Gmina Sompolno in Greater Poland Voivodeship (west-central Poland)
Zakrzewek, Gmina Wierzbinek in Greater Poland Voivodeship (west-central Poland)